Somnuek Srisombat (born 12 October 1932) is a Thai middle-distance runner. He competed in the men's 1500 metres at the 1956 Summer Olympics.

References

1932 births
Living people
Athletes (track and field) at the 1956 Summer Olympics
Athletes (track and field) at the 1960 Summer Olympics
Somnuek Srisombat
Somnuek Srisombat
Somnuek Srisombat
Place of birth missing (living people)
Southeast Asian Games medalists in athletics
Somnuek Srisombat
Competitors at the 1959 Southeast Asian Peninsular Games
Somnuek Srisombat
Somnuek Srisombat